Eugene Czolij was called to the Quebec Bar in 1982 and is a senior partner at Lavery, de Billy, one of the largest law firms in Quebec, with more than 200 lawyers. His legal practice includes corporate and commercial litigation, as well as insolvency and financial restructuring law. He pleads before the Supreme Court of Canada, as well as all court levels in Quebec.

Since 2012, he has been listed in his areas of practice by Best Lawyers, one of the oldest and most respected publications in the legal profession.

He is the Head of the Ukrainian World Congress International Observation Mission to Ukraine's 2019 Elections. Since 1993, he has been a member of the Board of Directors of the Ukrainian World Congress. For 10 years, from 2008 to 2018, he was President of the Ukrainian World Congress.

In his second five-year term as Ukrainian World Congress President, he made 147 international trips to 51 countries, where he had 1,500 bilateral meetings with Church hierarchs and high-level officials of state governments and international organizations (such as the UN, OSCE, Council of Europe, NATO and the EU), gave 160 public speeches at official events, and had 200 community meetings.

The Ukrainian World Congress is the international coordinating body for Ukrainian communities in the diaspora, representing the interests of over 20 million Ukrainians. The Ukrainian World Congress has a network of member organizations and ties with Ukrainians in 62 countries. Founded in 1967, the Ukrainian World Congress was recognized in 2003 by the United Nations Economic and Social Council as a non-governmental organization with special consultative status and obtained in 2018 participatory status as an international non-governmental organization with the Council of Europe.

Since 2019, he has been President of NGO «Ukraine-2050», a non-governmental organization that works with stakeholders within Ukraine, the international community and the Ukrainian diaspora to  help establish a shared vision of Ukraine's future and implement, within one generation -  namely by 2050, a strategy for the sustainable development of Ukraine as a fully independent, territorially integral, democratic, reformed and economically competitive European state.

Since 2004, he has been a member of the Board of Directors of the Caisse populaire Desjardins Ukrainienne de Montréal, a Ukrainian Canadian credit union (he was president from 2006 to 2019). Since 2006, he has been a member of the Board of Directors of the Council of Ukrainian Credit Unions of Canada. Since 2018, he has been a member of the East of Montreal Community Collaboration Group of the Fédération des caisses Desjardins du Québec, the largest cooperative financial group in Canada (from 2009 to 2018, he was a member of the Council of Representatives, East of Montreal, of the Fédération des caisses Desjardins du Québec).

Awards 

 In 2016, he received an honorary doctorate from Lviv Polytechnic National University in Ukraine for his contribution to promoting Ukraine's interests and its Euro-integration.
 In 2019, he received an honorary doctorate from the National University of Kyiv-Mohyla Academy in Ukraine for his outstanding achievements as a community leader.
 Since 1994, he has been a member of the Board of Directors of the Ukrainian Canadian Congress (he was president from 1998 to 2004).
 He has received several awards, including the Queen Elizabeth II Diamond Jubilee Medal, the Queen Elizabeth II Golden Jubilee Medal, 
 the Order of Metropolitan Andrey Sheptytsky, the highest award of the Ukrainian Greek-Catholic Church,
 the Order of Merit of Ukraine III Degree, 
 the Commemorative Medal of the President of Ukraine - “25 years of the Independence of Ukraine”, 
 the Medal of the National Olympic Committee of Ukraine, 
 the St. Voldymyr the Great Medal of the Ukrainian World Congress, 
 the Shevchenko Medal of the Ukrainian Canadian Congress.

Private life 
He is married to Anna and they have three children – Melania, Stephane and Sophie  –and two grandchildren – Zachary and Julia.

References

External links
 Eugene Czolij, Biography on the website of Ukrainian World Congress
Profile of Eugene Czolij on the website of the Canadian law firm "Lavery"
Eugene Czolij visits XXIII Congress of UCC November 5-7, 2010 in Edmonton, Alberta

 	 

1959 births
Living people
Lawyers from Montreal
Canadian people of Ukrainian descent